Izaak Herman Reijnders (27 March 1879 – 31 December 1966) was in charge of the Dutch military high command just prior to World War II. He was replaced by Henri Winkelman after Reijnders had had an argument with Defense Minister Adriaan Dijxhoorn who repeatedly went behind his back and conspired to keep from him the authority that was lawfully his during the state of war. During the short German campaign in the Netherlands, May 1940, General Reijnders' predictions about the airborne assault on airfields in Holland, the German breakthrough at Mill, as well as the viability of the IJssel Line and Grebbe Line were proven spot on.

References 
 De Jong, Lou. (1969). Het Koninkrijk der Nederlanden in de Tweede Wereldoorlog. The Hague.

External links 
 Biografisch Woordenboek van Nederland 
 Nederlandse opper- en hoofdofficieren 
 Izaak Herman Reijnders Een Miskend Generaal  

1879 births
1966 deaths
Commanders-in-chief of the Armed Forces of the Netherlands
People from Stadskanaal
Royal Netherlands Army generals
Royal Netherlands Army personnel of World War II